Daegok Station is a station on the Ilsan Line and the Gyeongui-Jungang Line. It is located in the city of Goyang, close to Ilsan. It is mainly used as a transfer station between the two lines rather than as an actual enter-and-exit stop, as the station is located in the midst of farmland with very little local resident demand.

It will host a third line for transfer in the future, as the Seohae Line will be built and brought northward in January 2023. This will allow for much faster, direct subway travel between Ilsan, Gimpo Airport, Bucheon, Siheung, and Ansan.

Vicinity
Exit 1: Neunggok Elementary School
Exit 5: Daegok Elementary School

References

External links
 Station information from Korail

Railway stations opened in 1996
Seoul Metropolitan Subway stations
Metro stations in Goyang
Seoul Subway Line 3
Gyeongui Line
Gyeongui–Jungang Line
1996 establishments in South Korea
20th-century architecture in South Korea